The 2018–19 Argentine Primera División – Superliga Argentina (officially the Superliga Quilmes Clásica for sponsorship reasons) was the 129 season of top-flight professional football in Argentina. The season began on 10 August 2018 and ended on 7 April 2019. Boca Juniors were the defending champions.

Twenty-six teams competed in the league, twenty-four returning from the 2017–18 season and two promoted from the 2017–18 Primera B Nacional (Aldosivi and San Martín (T)). Four teams (Temperley, Olimpo, Arsenal, and Chacarita Juniors) were relegated to the Primera B Nacional championship in the previous tournament.

Racing won their eighteenth national league championship with one match to spare after a 1–1 draw against Tigre on 31 March 2019.

Competition format
The tournament was contested by 26 teams. It began on 10 August 2018 and ended on 7 April 2019. Each team played the other 25 teams in a single round-robin tournament. The additional match against the main rival team in the so-called "Fecha de Clásicos" was once again omitted in this season. From 14 April to 2 June 2019, the Primera División played a new competition named "Copa de la Superliga".

Club information

Stadia and locations

Personnel

Managerial changes

Interim managers
1.  Darío Cavallo was interim manager in the 2017–18 Copa Argentina round of 64.
2.  Rodrigo Acosta was interim manager in the 4th round.
3.  Martín De León was interim manager in the 6th round.
4.  Ariel Martos was interim manager in the 6th round.
5.  Juan Carlos Blengio was interim manager in the 7th round.
6.  Diego Monarriz was interim manager in the 11th round.
7.  Esteban Fuertes was interim manager until the end of 2018.
8.  Raúl Sanzotti was interim manager until the end of 2018.
9.  Interim manager, but later promoted to manager.
10.  Floreal García was interim manager in the 20th round.
11.  Daniel Oldrá was interim manager in the 21st round.
12.  Pablo Quatrocchi was interim manager in the 21st and 22nd rounds.
13.  Marcelo Goux was interim manager in the 22nd round.

Foreign players

Players holding Argentinian dual nationality
They do not take foreign slot.

 Raúl Bobadilla (Argentinos Juniors)
 Lucas Barrios (Huracán)
 Norberto Briasco-Balekian (Huracán)
 Pablo Hernández (Independiente)
 Dylan Gissi (Patronato)
 Gabriel Arias (Racing)
 Carlos Olses (Racing)
 Camilo Mayada (River Plate)
 Néstor Ortigoza (Rosario Central)
 Joel Soñora (Talleres (C))
 Mauricio Toni (Talleres (C))

Source: AFA

League table

Results
Teams played every other team once (either at home or away) completing a total of 25 rounds.

Season statistics

Top goalscorers

Source: AFA

Top assists

Source: AFA

Relegation
Relegation at the end of the season is based on coefficients, which take into consideration the points obtained by the clubs during the present season and the two previous seasons (only seasons at the top flight are counted). The total tally is then divided by the number of games played in the top flight over those three seasons and an average is calculated. The four teams with the worst average at the end of the season were relegated to Primera B Nacional.

Source: AFA

Awards
The following players were rewarded for their performances during the season.

Best goalkeeper:  Esteban Andrada (Boca Juniors)
Best defender:  Javier Pinola (River Plate)
Best midfielder:  Nicolás Domínguez (Vélez Sarsfield)
Best forward:  Lisandro López (Racing)
Best save:  Alan Aguerre (Newell's Old Boys) against San Lorenzo
Best goal:  Emanuel Reynoso (Boca Juniors) against San Martín (T)
Best coach:  Eduardo Coudet (Racing)
Best player:  Lisandro López (Racing)
Topscorer:  Lisandro López (Racing)
Honorary Award:  Pablo Guiñazú (Talleres (C)),  Rodrigo Mora (River Plate),  Rodrigo Braña (Estudiantes (LP)) and  Sebastián Bertoli (Patronato)
Breakthrough player:  Matías Zaracho (Racing)
Fair Play: Defensa y Justicia
SAF de Oro: Racing

2018–19 Superliga Argentina de Fútbol team

See also
 2019 Copa de la Superliga
 2018–19 Primera B Nacional
 2018–19 Copa Argentina

References

External links
 AFA - Sitio Oficial
 Superliga Argentina official website

Argentine Primera División seasons
2018–19 in Argentine football leagues